Kasun Abeyrathne (born 7 August 1998) is a Sri Lankan cricketer. He made his Twenty20 debut for Sri Lanka Air Force Sports Club in the 2017–18 SLC Twenty20 Tournament on 1 March 2018. He made his List A debut for Bloomfield Cricket and Athletic Club in the 2018–19 Premier Limited Overs Tournament on 4 March 2019.

References

External links
 

1998 births
Living people
Sri Lankan cricketers
Bloomfield Cricket and Athletic Club cricketers
Sri Lanka Air Force Sports Club cricketers
People from Ragama